Ji Chang-wook (born 5 July 1987) is a South Korean actor and singer. He rose to fame for playing the lead role of Dong-hae in daily drama series Smile Again (2010–2011), and had notable lead roles in television series such as Warrior Baek Dong-soo (2011), Empress Ki (2013–2014), Healer (2014–2015), The K2 (2016), Suspicious Partner (2017), Melting Me Softly (2019), Backstreet Rookie (2020), Lovestruck in the City (2020-2021), The Sound of Magic (2022), and If You Wish Upon Me (2022).

Career

2006–2009: Beginnings
Ji began his career in musical theatre. He made his onscreen debut in the 2006 film Days... and had a minor role in the 2008 television drama You Stole My Heart. He officially debuted in 2008 through the film, Sleeping Beauty.

In 2009, he appeared in My Too Perfect Sons, playing the timid, youngest brother who ends up raising his best friend's daughter at just 20 years old. The weekend family drama received over 40% ratings. He then took on a supporting role in the action-comedy Hero.

2010–2012: Rising popularity

In 2010, Ji was cast in his first lead role in the 159-episode daily drama, Smile Again, playing the role of a Korean-American short track speed skater. Smile Again topped the ratings chart for 15 consecutive weeks, and he was awarded "Best Actor in a Daily Drama" at the KBS Drama Awards.

He then played the titular character in 2011 historical-action series, Warrior Baek Dong-soo (2011). Adapted from Lee Jae-heon's manhwa, Honorable Baek Dong-soo, it is an origin story about Joseon-era swordsman, Baek Dong-soo, showing his early years until political intrigue creates a rivalry with his childhood best friend-turned-enemy. The series topped in its timeslot for 13 weeks, and Ji received a "New Star Award" at the SBS Drama Awards. Later that year, he played the lead role in cable drama, Bachelor's Vegetable Store which is based on the true story of Lee Young-seok, a young man who turned a tiny 350-square-feet vegetable store in 1998 into a nationwide franchise with 33 stores.

On his first antagonist role in the melodrama, Five Fingers (2012), Ji played a pianist who envies his older brother's natural gift for music.

Ji returned to musical theater in 2013 with The Days, playing a presidential bodyguard who went missing 20 years ago along with a mysterious female companion. The Days was a jukebox musical using the folk rock songs of Kim Kwang-seok.

2013–2022: Breakthrough and overseas ventures
Ji's breakthrough came through his role as Toghon Temür (also known as Ta Hwan), the 16th emperor of the Yuan Dynasty, in the historical drama Empress Ki. The drama drew solid viewership ratings nationwide throughout its run with an average rating of 35.12%. Ji's portrayal left a strong impression on both the critics and the audience, earning him critical acclaim and recognition.

Ji then starred as the titular character in action-thriller television series, Healer (2014-2015). After the airing of the drama, Ji became popular in China and other parts of Asia. He then took on roles in Mandarin-language dramas such as The Whirlwind Girl 2 and Mr. Right.

In 2016, Ji starred as the male lead in tvN's action-thriller The K2, a bodyguard who is betrayed by his fellow countrymen and falls in love with a girl with PTSD and apparent sociophobia. The drama received favorable reviews, topping cable channel viewership ratings throughout its 8-week broadcast. In November 2016, he co-starred in the promotional web-drama series, First Seven Kisses for Lotte Duty Free.

In 2017, Ji starred in the action film, Fabricated City, playing the role of a jobless game addict who becomes a framed murderer. The same year, he was cast in SBS's romantic comedy thriller series, Suspicious Partner, as a prosecutor, which premiered in May.

Following his discharge from military in 2019, Ji was cast in the romantic comedy series Melting Me Softly, where he played the role of a television producer who finds himself waking up 20 years into the future following an unsuccessful human-freezing project.

In 2020, Ji was cast in the romantic comedy series, Backstreet Rookie, based on a webtoon of the same name. He played the role of a former public-relations director of convenience stores franchises, who ends up managing his own convenience store. He also starred in romantic comedy web series Lovestruck in the City which premiered on Kakao TV in December 2020.

In 2021, he starred in the Kim Chang-ju's thriller film Hard Hit, playing a mysterious caller who blackmails the protagonist and his family with a bomb planted inside the car they are driving.

In 2022, Ji appeared in the Netflix series The Sound of Magic, based on a webtoon of the same name, in the role of mysterious magician Lee Eul. That same year, he starred in the KBS2 drama If You Wish Upon Me in the role of an ex-convict who volunteers at a hospice.

2023–present: Establishing an agency
In March 2023, Ji ended his contract with Glorious Entertainment. On March 14, 2023, Ji is in the stage on preparing to establish a one-man agency with his manager who has been working with him for more than ten years.

Personal life
Ji began his mandatory military service on 14 August 2017. He underwent his basic military training at the Army's 3rd Infantry Division at Cheorwon, Gangwon Province. Upon completion, he was awarded a prize for high performance.

Ji was assigned to the Army's 5th Artillery Brigade at Cheorwon, Gangwon Province, to complete the remainder of his military service. He was appointed as a Platoon Leader and promoted to Corporal. He was further promoted to Sergeant. Ji was discharged on 27 April 2019.

Philanthropy 
In February 2023, Ji donated 100 million won to help 2023 Turkey–Syria earthquake, by donating money through Hope Bridge National Disaster Relief Association.

Filmography

Film

Television series

Web series

Web shows

Music video appearances

Musical theater

Discography

Extended plays

Singles

Awards and nominations

References

External links

 Ji Chang-wook at Glorious Entertainment
 
 
 

21st-century South Korean male actors
South Korean male television actors
South Korean male film actors
South Korean male musical theatre actors
South Korean male web series actors
People from Anyang, Gyeonggi
Living people
1987 births
Dankook University alumni
Chungju Ji clan